Windsor Light Music Theatre (formerly named the Windsor Light Opera Association) is an amateur musical theatre company based in Windsor, Ontario presenting musical theatre to the Windsor-Essex County area. It was founded by John H. L. Watson in 1948 and since 1949 has presented two productions per year.

The company originally performed at the Walkerville Collegiate Institute. Its performance base is now St. Clair College's Chrysler Theatre in downtown Windsor.

References

External links
 
 Chrysler Theatre

Culture of Windsor, Ontario
Theatre companies in Ontario
Organizations based in Windsor, Ontario